Telecommunication Infrastructure Company (TIC) is the sole provider of telecommunication infrastructure to all private and public operators in Iran. TIC is also the sole party for all international gateways and IP capacity and connectivity services in the country.

References

External links
 

Telecommunications companies of Iran
Internet in Iran
Holding companies of Iran